Kokoszka may refer to:

Places
Kokoszka, Lublin Voivodeship (east Poland)
Kokoszka, Masovian Voivodeship (east-central Poland)
Kokoszka, Pomeranian Voivodeship (north Poland)
Kokoszka, Warmian-Masurian Voivodeship (north Poland)

People with the surname
Adam Kokoszka (born 1986), Polish footballer
Leszek Kokoszka (born 1951), Polish ice hockey player

Polish-language surnames